William Michael Albert Broad (born 30 November 1955), known professionally as Billy Idol, is a British singer, songwriter, musician and actor. He also holds United States citizenship. He first achieved fame in the 1970s emerging from the London punk rock scene as the lead singer of the group Generation X. Subsequently, he embarked on a solo career which led to international recognition and made Idol a lead artist during the MTV-driven "Second British Invasion" in the US. The name "Billy Idol" was inspired by a schoolteacher's description of him as "idle".

Idol began his music career in late 1976 as a guitarist in the punk rock band Chelsea. However, he soon left the group. With his former bandmate Tony James, Idol formed Generation X. With Idol as lead singer, the band achieved success in the United Kingdom and released three studio albums on Chrysalis Records, then disbanded. In 1981, Idol moved to New York City to pursue his solo career in collaboration with guitarist Steve Stevens. His debut studio album, Billy Idol (1982), was a commercial success. With music videos for singles "Dancing with Myself" and "White Wedding" Idol soon became a staple of then newly-established MTV.

Idol's second studio album, Rebel Yell (1983), was a major commercial success, featuring hit singles "Rebel Yell" and "Eyes Without a Face". The album was certified double platinum by the Recording Industry Association of America (RIAA) for shipment of two million copies in the US. In 1986, he released Whiplash Smile. Having accumulated three UK top 10 singles ("Rebel Yell", "White Wedding" and "Mony Mony") Idol released a 1988 greatest hits album titled Idol Songs: 11 of the Best; the album went platinum in the United Kingdom. Idol then released Charmed Life (1990) and the concept album Cyberpunk (1993).

Idol spent the second half of the 1990s focusing on his personal life out of the public eye. He made a musical comeback with the release of Devil's Playground (2005) and again with Kings & Queens of the Underground (2014).

Early life
Idol was born William Michael Albert Broad on 30 November 1955 in Stanmore, Middlesex, England. His parents were devout Anglicans and attended church regularly. Idol is half Irish, his mother was born in Cork and is an O'Sullivan. In 1958, when he was two years old, he moved with his parents to the US and settled in Patchogue, New York. They also lived in Rockville Centre, New York. His younger sister, Jane, was born during this time. The family returned to England four years later and settled in Dorking, Surrey.

In 1971, the family moved to Bromley in southeastern London, where Idol attended Ravensbourne School for Boys. His family later moved to the Worthing suburb of Goring-by-Sea in West Sussex, where he attended Worthing High School for Boys. In October 1975, he began attending the University of Sussex to pursue an English degree and lived on-campus (East Slope), but left after year one in 1976. He then joined the Bromley Contingent of Sex Pistols fans, a loosely organized gang that travelled to see the band wherever they played.

Career

1976–1981: Generation X

The name "Billy Idol" was coined due to a chemistry teacher's description of Idol on his school report card as "idle". Idol has stated that the subject was one that he hated and in which he underachieved. In an interview on 21 November 1983, Idol said the name "Billy Idol" "was a bit of a goof, but part of the old English school of rock. It was a 'double thing', not just a poke at the superstar-like people... It was fun, you know?" In another interview for BBC Breakfast in October 2014, he said that he wanted to use the name "Billy Idle", but thought the name would be unavailable due to its similarity to the name of Monty Python star Eric Idle and chose Billy Idol instead.

In late 1976, he joined the newly-formed West London 1960s retro-rock band Chelsea as a guitarist. The act's singer/frontman Gene October styled Idol's image, advising him to change his short sighted eye-glasses for contact lenses, and dye his hair blonde with a crew cut for a retro-1950s rocker look. After a few weeks performing with Chelsea, Idol and Tony James, the band's bass guitarist, quit the act and co-founded Generation X, with Idol switching from guitarist to the role of singer/frontman. Generation X was one of the first punk bands to appear on the BBC Television music programme Top of the Pops. Although a punk rock band, they were inspired by mid-1960s British pop, in sharp contrast to their more militant peers, with Idol stating; "We were saying the opposite to the Clash and the Pistols. They were singing 'No Elvis, Beatles or the Rolling Stones', but we were honest about what we liked. The truth was we were all building our music on the Beatles and the Stones".
In 1977, Idol sang "Your Generation" on the TV series Marc. Generation X signed a recording contract with Chrysalis Records, released three studio albums, performed in the 1980 film D.O.A.: A Rite of Passage, and then disbanded.

1981–1985: Solo career and breakthrough

Idol moved to New York City in 1981 and became a solo artist, working with former Kiss manager Bill Aucoin. Idol's punk-like image worked well with the glam rock style of his new partner on guitar, Steve Stevens. Together they worked with bassist Phil Feit and drummer Gregg Gerson. Idol's solo career began with the Chrysalis Records EP titled Don't Stop in 1981, which included the Generation X song "Dancing with Myself", originally recorded for their last album Kiss Me Deadly, and a cover of Tommy James and the Shondells' song "Mony Mony". Idol's debut solo album Billy Idol was released in July 1982.

Part of the MTV-driven "Second British Invasion" of the US in 1982, Idol became an MTV staple with "White Wedding" and "Dancing with Myself". The music video for "White Wedding" was filmed by the British director David Mallet, and played frequently on MTV. The motorcycle smashing through the church window stunt was carried out by John Wilson, a London motorcycle courier. In 1983, Idol's label released "Dancing with Myself" in the US in conjunction with a music video directed by Tobe Hooper, which played on MTV for six months.

Rebel Yell (1983), Idol's second LP, was a major success and established Idol in the United States with hits such as "Rebel Yell", "Eyes Without a Face", and "Flesh for Fantasy". "Eyes Without a Face" peaked at number four on the US Billboard Hot 100, and "Rebel Yell" reached number six in the UK Singles Chart.

1986–1992: Whiplash Smile and Charmed Life

Idol released Whiplash Smile in 1986, which sold well. The album included the hits "To Be a Lover", "Don't Need a Gun" and "Sweet Sixteen". Idol filmed a video for the song "Sweet Sixteen" in Florida's Coral Castle.

A remix album was released in 1987, titled Vital Idol. The album featured a live rendition of his cover of Tommy James' "Mony Mony". In 1987 the single topped the United States chart and reached number 7 in the UK.

Charmed Life was released in 1990, and a video for the single "Cradle of Love" had to be shot. The song had been featured in the Andrew Dice Clay film The Adventures of Ford Fairlane. Because Idol was unable to walk, due to injuries he sustained in a motorcycle accident, he was shot from the waist up. The video featured video footage of him singing in large frames throughout an apartment while Betsy Lynn George was trying to seduce a businessman. The video was placed in rotation on MTV. "Cradle of Love" earned Idol a third Grammy nomination for Best Male Rock Vocal Performance.

1993–2004: Cyberpunk, decline, and resurgence

In 1993, Idol released Cyberpunk. Regarded as experimental, it was recorded in a home studio using a Macintosh computer. Idol used Studiovision and Pro Tools to record the album. The album took ten months to make. The album did not perform well in the United States and the lead single "Shock to the System" did not chart in the Billboard Hot 100. By Comparison, the lead single from Idols previous album, Cradle of Love had peaked at No.2. In Europe the album fared slightly better, achieving moderate chart success and peaking within the UK top 20. Idol toured in Europe and played a Generation X reunion show in 1993.

He recorded and released the single "Speed" in 1994; the song was featured as first track in the homonymous movie soundtrack album. Idol appeared in a 1996 live version of the Who's Quadrophenia. Idol made a cameo appearance as himself in the 1998 film The Wedding Singer with Adam Sandler, in which Idol played a pivotal role in the plot. The film featured "White Wedding" on its soundtrack. In 2000, he was invited to be a guest vocalist on Tony Iommi's debut solo album. His contribution was on the song "Into the Night", which he co-wrote. That year, he voice acted the role of Odin, a mysterious alien character, in the adult animated science fiction film Heavy Metal 2000, also providing a song for the soundtrack.

VH1 aired Billy Idol – Behind the Music on 16 April 2001. Idol and Stevens took part in a VH1 Storytellers show three days later. The reunited duo set out to play a series of acoustic/storytellers shows before recording the VH1 special. Another Greatest Hits CD was issued in 2001, with Keith Forsey and Simple Minds' "Don't You (Forget About Me)" appearing on the compilation. The LP includes a live acoustic version of "Rebel Yell", taken from a performance at Los Angeles station KROQ's 1993 Acoustic Christmas concert. The Greatest Hits album sold 1 million copies in the United States alone.

In the 2002 NRL Grand Final in Sydney, Idol entered the playing field for the half-time entertainment on a hovercraft to the intro of "White Wedding", of which he managed to sing only two words before a power failure ended the performance.

2005–2009: Devil's Playground

Devil's Playground, which came out in March 2005, was Idol's first new studio album in nearly 12 years. The album reached No. 46 on the Billboard 200. The album included a cover of "Plastic Jesus". Idol played a handful of dates on the 2005 Vans Warped Tour and appeared at the Download Festival at Donington Park, the Voodoo Music Experience in New Orleans, and Rock am Ring.

In 2008, "Rebel Yell" appeared as a playable track on the video game Guitar Hero World Tour and "White Wedding" on Rock Band 2. The Rock Band 2 platform later gained "Mony Mony" and "Rebel Yell" as downloadable tracks. On 24 June 2008, Idol released the greatest hits album The Very Best of Billy Idol: Idolize Yourself. He embarked on a worldwide tour, co-headlining with Def Leppard.

In June 2006, Idol performed at the Congress Theater, Chicago for the United States television series Soundstage. This performance was recorded and then released on DVD/Blu-ray as In Super Overdrive Live, on 17 November 2009.

2010–present: Kings & Queens of the Underground

On 16 February 2010, Idol was announced as one of the acts to play at the Download Festival in Donington Park, England. He stated "With all of these great heavyweight and cool bands playing Download this year, I'm going to have to come armed with my punk rock attitude, Steve Stevens, and all of my classic songs plus a couple of way out covers. Should be fun!" In March 2010, Idol added Camp Freddy guitarist Billy Morrison and drummer Jeremy Colson to his touring line-up.

In 2013, Idol appeared on the third episode of the BBC Four series How the Brits Rocked America. Idol also lent his voice as Spikey Hair Bot to Disney XD's Randy Cunningham: 9th Grade Ninja episode "McSatchle"

In October 2014, Idol released his eighth studio album Kings & Queens of the Underground. While recording the album between 2010 and 2014, he worked with producer Trevor Horn, Horn's former Buggles and Yes bandmate Geoff Downes and Greg Kurstin. Idol's autobiography, Dancing with Myself, was published on 7 October 2014 and became a New York Times bestseller.

On 30 October 2018, former Generation X members Idol and Tony James joined with Steve Jones and Paul Cook, former members of another first wave English punk rock band, the Sex Pistols, to perform a free gig at the Roxy in Hollywood, Los Angeles, under the name Generation Sex, playing a combined set of the two former bands' material.

In late February 2020, Idol starred in a public service campaign with the New York City Department of Environmental Protection Police titled "Billy Never Idles", intended to fight the unnecessary idling of automobile engines in New York City, to reduce air pollution. Idol teamed with New York Mayor Bill de Blasio to open the campaign, which features Idol saying "If you're not driving, shut your damn engine off!" and other strong advice. He was a guest vocalist on the song "Night Crawling" from Miley Cyrus' album Plastic Hearts released in November 2020. In 2016, Idol and Cyrus performed "Rebel Yell" at the iHeartRadio Festival in Las Vegas.

On 12 August 2021, Idol's music video "Bitter Taste", directed by Stephen Sebring, was uploaded to YouTube. Idol announced his new EP The Roadside, which was released on 17 September. Another EP, The Cage, was released on 23 September 2022. A video for the title track, also directed by Sebring, premiered on YouTube 17 August.

In March 2022, Idol was diagnosed with MRSA which forced him to cancel a co-headlining tour with Journey.

In September 2022, he embarked on the postponed Roadside Tour with Killing Joke and Toyah as his UK opening acts in October.

On 6 January 2023, Idol was honoured with a star on the Hollywood Walk of Fame. On January 24, he announced a North American tour from late March through mid-May: the tour will begin in Scottsdale on March 30, and conclude with a concert at the Cruel World Festival on May 20 at the Rose Bowl in Pasadena.

Live band
Idol's live band consists of:
 Billy Idol – lead vocals (1981–present)
 Steve Stevens – lead guitar, keyboards, backing vocals (1981–1987, 1993, 1995, 1999–present)
 Stephen McGrath – bass, backing vocals (2001–present)
 Billy Morrison – rhythm and lead guitar, backing vocals (2010–present)
 Erik Eldenius – drums (2012–present)
 Paul Trudeau – keyboards, rhythm guitar, backing vocals (2014–present)

Former members
 Phil Feit – bass (1981–1983)
 Steve Missal – drums (1981–1982)
 Gregg Gerson – drums (1982–1983)
 Judi Dozier – keyboards (1982–1985)
 Steve Webster – bass (1983–1985)
 Thommy Price – drums (1983–1987)
 Kenny Aaronson – bass (1986–1987)
 Susie Davis – keyboards, backing vocals (1986–1987)
 Mark Younger-Smith – lead and rhythm guitar (1988–1993)
 Phil Soussan – bass (1988–1990)
 Larry Seymour – bass (1990–1996)
 Tal Bergman – drums (1990–1993)
 Bonnie Hayes – keyboards, backing vocals (1990–1991)
 Jennifer Blakeman – keyboards (1993)
 Julie Greaux – keyboards (1993)
 Danny Sadownik – drums (1993)
 Mark Schulman – drums (1993–2001)
 Sasha Krivtsov – bass (2000)
 Brian Tichy – drums (2001–2009)
 Jeremy Colson – drums (2010–2012)
 Derek Sherinian – keyboards (2002–2014)

Timeline

Personal life
Idol has never married, but had a long-term relationship with English singer, dancer, and former Hot Gossip member Perri Lister. They have a son, Willem Wolf Broad, who was born in Los Angeles in 1988. Willem has been a member of the rock band FIM. Lister and Idol separated in 1989. Idol also has a daughter, Bonnie Blue, from a relationship with Linda Mathis.

On 6 February 1990 in Hollywood, Idol was involved in a serious motorcycle accident that nearly cost him a leg. He was hit by a car when he ran a stop sign while riding home from the studio one night, requiring a steel rod to be placed in his leg. Shortly prior to this, film director Oliver Stone had chosen Idol for the role of Jim Morrison's drinking pal Cat in his film The Doors (1991), but the accident prevented him from participating in a major way and Idol's role was reduced to a small part. He had been James Cameron's first choice for the role of the villainous T-1000 in Terminator 2: Judgment Day (1991); the role was recast as a result of the accident.

Idol has struggled with alcoholism and drug addiction. His drug history includes heroin and cocaine. In his 2014 memoir, he stated that he had many experiences of passing out in nightclubs and waking up in hospitals. In 1994, Idol collapsed outside a Los Angeles nightclub due to an overdose of the drug GHB. After the incident, Idol decided that his children would never forgive him for dying of a drug overdose, and he ceased his drug use. In 2014, Idol stated that he had not taken hard drugs since 2003, but added that he smoked marijuana regularly and was an occasional drinker.

In 2018, Idol became an American citizen during a ceremony in Los Angeles, while retaining his British citizenship. In 2020, his daughter Bonnie gave birth to his first grandchild, daughter, Poppy Rebel, and in 2022, another granddaughter, Mary Jane.

Discography

Studio albums
 Billy Idol (1982)
 Rebel Yell (1983)
 Whiplash Smile (1986)
 Charmed Life (1990)
 Cyberpunk (1993)
 Devil's Playground (2005)
 Happy Holidays (2006)
 Kings & Queens of the Underground (2014)

Extended plays
 Don't Stop (1981)
 White Wedding (1982)
 The Roadside (2021)
 The Cage (2022)

Awards and nominations

ASCAP Pop Music Awards

!Ref.
|-
| 1991
| "Cradle of Love"
| Most Performed Song
| 
|

Classic Rock Roll of Honour Awards

!Ref.
|-
| 2005
| Himself
| Comeback of the Year
| 
|

Grammy Awards

!Ref.
|-
! scope="row" | 
|"Rebel Yell"
| rowspan=3|Best Male Rock Vocal Performance
| 
| 
|-
! scope="row" | 
|"To Be a Lover"
| 
| 
|-
! scope="row" | 
|"Cradle of Love"
| 
|

MTV Video Music Awards
The MTV Video Music Awards is an annual awards ceremony established in 1984 by MTV.

|-
! scope="row" | 
|"Dancing with Myself" || Best Direction || 
|-
! scope="row" | 
|"Dancing with Myself" || Best Art Direction || 
|-
! scope="row" | 
|"Dancing with Myself" || Best Special Effects || 
|-
! scope="row" | 
|"Eyes Without a Face" || Best Cinematography || 
|-
! scope="row" | 
|"Eyes Without a Face" || Best Editing || 
|-
! scope="row" | 
| "Cradle of Love" || Best Video from a Film || 
|-
! scope="row" | 
|"Cradle of Love" || Best Male Video || 
|-
! scope="row" | 
|"Cradle of Love" || Best Special Effects || 
|-
! scope="row" | 
|"Shock to the System" || Best Special Effects || 
|-
! scope="row" | 
|"Shock to the System" || Best Editing ||

Brit Awards
The Brit Awards are the British Phonographic Industry's annual pop music awards.

|-
! scope="row" | 
| Billy Idol – "Cradle of Love" || Best British Video ||

Pollstar Concert Industry Awards

!Ref.
|-
| 1988
| Tour
| Most Creative Tour Package
| 
|

See also
 Coral Castle, a stone structure where Idol got his inspiration for his song "Sweet Sixteen"
 Bromley Contingent

References

Reference bibliography

Further reading

External links

  – official site
 
 
 
 Billy Idol at Rolling Stone
  interview @ Legends

1955 births
Living people
20th-century English male actors
20th-century English male singers
21st-century English male actors
21st-century English male singers
Alumni of the University of Sussex
Brit Award winners
British expatriate male actors in the United States
English expatriates in the United States
British hard rock musicians
English male film actors
English male singer-songwriters
English new wave musicians
British post-punk musicians
English punk rock singers
English rock singers
English people of Irish descent
Bromley Contingent
Chrysalis Records artists
EMI Records artists
Generation X (band) members
Glam rock musicians
Male actors from Kent
Male actors from London
Male new wave singers
Musicians from Kent
Musicians from London
Naturalized citizens of the United States
Neurotic Outsiders members
People educated at Ravensbourne School, Bromley
People educated at Worthing High School
People from Bromley
People from Dorking
People from Goring-by-Sea
People from Stanmore
Sanctuary Records artists
Second British Invasion artists
Singers from London